Mai Mercado (born 20 August 1980 in Tønder) is a Danish politician, who is a member of the Folketing for the Conservative People's Party. She was elected at the 2011 Danish general election. From 2016 to 2019 she was the Minister for Children and Social Affairs in the Lars Løkke Rasmussen III Cabinet.

Political career
Mercado was a member of the municipal council of Odense Municipality from 2006 to 2011, and served as the second deputy mayor from 2009 to 2011. From 2013 to 2016 she sat in the municipal council of Frederiksberg Municipality.

She was elected to the Folketing in the 2011 election. On 28 November 2016, she was appointed as Minister for Children and Social Affairs in the Lars Løkke Rasmussen III Cabinet.
Shortly after introducing laws which would prohibit troublesome minority protests in Freetown Christiania, she had domestic terrorist Thomas Dall, the nephew of Danish politician Benny Dall, arrested for terroristic threats against her on facebook. Afterwards she left the Folketing.

Personal life
Mercado has a Master of Science from the University of Southern Denmark.

She is married to Christopher Mercado, with whom she has a son, Winston, and a daughter, Elisa.

References

External links
 

|-

1980 births
Living people
People from Tønder Municipality
Conservative People's Party (Denmark) politicians
University of Southern Denmark alumni
Government ministers of Denmark
Women government ministers of Denmark
Danish municipal councillors
21st-century Danish women politicians
Women members of the Folketing
Members of the Folketing 2011–2015
Members of the Folketing 2015–2019
Members of the Folketing 2019–2022
Members of the Folketing 2022–2026